Wacko is a 1982 American comedy horror film produced and directed by Greydon Clark and starring Joe Don Baker and George Kennedy.

Plot

Dick Harbinger (Joe Don Baker) is a police officer obsessed with stopping history repeating itself. Thirteen years ago a man wearing a pumpkinhead and driving a lawnmower murdered several children. The night is Halloween and everyone is a suspect. The school janitor, Zeke, is brought in for questioning. Throughout the film, when the word "geek" is used, he reappears and corrects the speaker saying, "it's Zeeeeke". The father of the family (George Kennedy) is too obvious a suspect and is questioned by police. He is usually caught by his daughter Mary, trying to creep into the bathroom when she is showering, or peering in her window whilst she is sleeping. His daughter catches him and screams and always says the same line, "Damn it Daddy, what are you doing?" Kennedy always replies, "I'm just, erm, mowing the lawn." The daughter replies always the same, "sure Daddy, that's what you always say." Mary's friend Rosie is dating Tony "the Schlong" Schlongini, who is the coolest kid in school. He along with many others get killed by Mr. Pumpkinhead which is played by detective (Baker).

In the end the detective dresses up as the Lawnmower Killer because no one is taking the threat seriously so he decides to teach them all a lesson.
It all started exactly 13 years ago, when Mary Graves' older sister was murdered on Halloween prom night by a power-mowing maniac. Since then, Mary has experienced horror, sexual frustration, even psychoanalysis, but she still sees little lawnmowers everywhere. But tonight will be different. Tonight, at the new Halloween Prom, all the questions of the past 13 years will be answered as the pumpkin headed killer has returned. But hot on their trail is an obsessed cop (Joe Don Baker) who won't allow history to repeat itself.

The film borders on the ridiculous at times when Baker's family, all black eat cake at the dinner table and the slices of cake they enjoy are the size of a dinner plate. Baker also fills his suitcase (which has a tap on it) with coffee and later terminates Harry Vice (Vice principal) who is in charge of the vice. Harry Vice likes to "clamp on down," on student slackers but he ends up having his head clamped on down in a vice courtesy of Baker.

Cast
 Joe Don Baker as Dick Harbinger
 Stella Stevens as Mrs. Doctor Graves
 George Kennedy as Mr. Doctor Graves
 Julia Duffy as Mary Graves
 Scott McGinnis as Norman Bates
 Elizabeth Daily as Bambi
 Michele Tobin as Rosie
 Andrew Dice Clay as Tony Schlongini (credited as Andrew Clay)
 Anthony James as Zeke
 Sonny Carl Davis as The Weirdo (credited as Sonny Davis)
 David Drucker as The Looney
 Jeff Altman as Harry Palms
 Victor Brandt as Dr. Moreau
 Wil Albert as Dr. Denton
 Charles Napier as Chief O'Hara

Release
The film was released theatrically in the United States by Jensen Farley Pictures in January 1983.

Critical reception
Jeremy Wheeler of AllMovie gave the film one out of five stars, and wrote: "Wacko virtually vanished from the face of the earth, which, as it turns out, isn't necessarily a bad thing. For its hundreds of gags and zingers, there are actually very few laughs in a seemingly endless 84-minute running time." Chris Coffel of Bloody Disgusting praised the film's "frenetic energy" and "killer ensemble cast", writing: "Wacko is not a movie everyone is going to love or even like. Not all the jokes land, and depending on who you ask none of them do. But I can't help but love this movie."

Home media
The film was released on VHS by Vestron Video, and was also released on LaserDisc.

In February 2019, the film was remastered in 4K and released on DVD and Blu-ray by Vinegar Syndrome.

References

External links
 
 
 

1982 films
American parody films
1980s English-language films
Films set in California
American comedy horror films
Films directed by Greydon Clark
1980s comedy horror films
1982 comedy films
1980s American films
American films about Halloween